2-hydroxy-6-oxo-6-(2-aminophenyl)hexa-2,4-dienoate hydrolase (CarC) is an enzyme with systematic name (2E,4E)-6-(2-aminophenyl)-2-hydroxy-6-oxohexa-2,4-dienoate acylhydrolase. This enzyme catalyses the following chemical reaction

 (2E,4E)-6-(2-aminophenyl)-2-hydroxy-6-oxohexa-2,4-dienoate + H2O  anthranilate + (2E)-2-hydroxypenta-2,4-dienoate

This enzyme catalyses the third step in the aerobic degradation pathway of carbazole.

References

External links 

EC 3.7.1